Winston Dan Vogel (born 1943) is an  Israeli-born American conductor. He was the musical director of the Virginia Symphony Orchestra from 1986 to 1990 and is the founder, President, and Artistic Director of Opera USA.

References

American male conductors (music)
Living people
1943 births
21st-century American conductors (music)
21st-century American male musicians
Date of birth missing (living people)